A competition regulator is the institution that oversees the functioning of markets. It identifies and corrects practices causing market impediments and distortions through competition law (also known as antitrust law). In general it is a government agency, typically a statutory authority, sometimes called an economic regulator, that regulates and enforces competition laws and may sometimes also enforce consumer protection laws. In addition to such agencies, there is often another body responsible for formulating competition policy.

Many nations implement competition laws, and there is general agreement on acceptable standards of behaviour. The degree to which countries enforce their competition policy varies substantially.

Competition regulators may also regulate certain aspects of mergers and acquisitions and business alliances and regulate or prohibit cartels and monopolies. Other government agencies may have responsibilities in relation to aspects of competition law that affect companies (e.g., the registrar of companies).

Regulators may form supranational or international alliances like the ECN (European Competition Network), the ICN (International Competition Network), and the OECD (Organisation for Economic Co-operation and Development).

List of trade blocs and multinational regulators

List of national regulators

See also
Consumer protection
Transparency (market)
Transparency (humanities)

References

External links
 

 
Competition (economics)
Anti-competitive practices
Imperfect competition
Monopoly (economics)